Brett Larson is an American ice hockey coach and former player. He is the current head coach of St. Cloud State, having been named to the position in April 2018.

Playing career
After being drafted out of high school, Larson waited a year before beginning his college career at Minnesota–Duluth. In his freshman season he scored only three points in 26 games for a middling team. The following year the Bulldogs rocketed up the standings, winning the WCHA and making the NCAA tournament. In his junior season Larson was given a great role with the team and responded by posting more than quintuple his previous season's total. Despite this Duluth dropped to 7th in the WCHA and stayed there for the rest of Larson's college career. After graduating Larson embarked on a long career that was spent mostly in the minor leagues in North America. During the later half of the 1990s he also played roller hockey in the RHI, stopping only due to the league ceasing operations.

In 2001, After winning the Taylor Cup with San Diego Larson signed with Rote Teufel Bad Nauheim of the German second league playing one season for the Red Devils before joining the Odense Bulldogs. In his first season with the Bulldogs he helped the team win the regular season title but fell in the championship match. The team had diminishing returns each of the following two years and after splitting the 2005-06 season between Bad Nauheim and Basingstoke Larson returned to the states for one more season before retiring as a player.

Coaching career
During his playing career Larson had twice served as a player/coach; for two years with the San Diego Gulls and in his brief stint with Florida Seals. After his playing days were over Larson took a year off before returning as a full-time coach, joining the staff at his alma mater as an assistant. After only three years behind the bench he was hired as the head coach/GM for the Sioux City Musketeers, but after two poor seasons he headed back to the college ranks. After a two-year stop at Ohio State he began a third stint with Minnesota–Duluth, staying for another three seasons before he received his first opportunity to lead a college program with St. Cloud State.

Career statistics

Awards and honours

Head coaching record

USHL

College

References

External links

1972 births
People from Duluth, Minnesota
Ice hockey coaches from Minnesota
Living people
American ice hockey coaches
Minnesota Duluth Bulldogs men's ice hockey players
Louisville RiverFrogs players
Utah Grizzlies (IHL) players
San Diego Gulls (WCHL) players
Long Beach Ice Dogs (IHL) players
Las Vegas Thunder players
Basingstoke Bison players
Orlando Seals (ACHL) players
Rote Teufel Bad Nauheim players
Odense Bulldogs players
Madison Monsters players
Minnesota Arctic Blast players
Orlando Jackals players
Minnesota Blue Ox players
St. Cloud State Huskies men's ice hockey coaches
Florida Seals players
American men's ice hockey defensemen
Ice hockey players from Minnesota